Richard Mosse (born 1980) is an Irish conceptual documentary photographer.

Early life and education
Mosse was born in Kilkenny, Ireland. He lives and works in New York and Berlin.
He received a first class BA in English literature from King's College London in 2001, an MRes in cultural studies from the London Consortium in 2003, a postgraduate diploma in fine art from Goldsmiths, University of London in 2005 and a photography MFA from Yale School of Art in 2008.

Work 
Critic Sean O'Hagan, writing in The Guardian, said "His images from there often seem to skirt the real and the fictional, simply though [sic] their heightened and unreal colours. He has made the familiar seem strange and the real seem heightened to the point of absurdity. This is war reportage – but not as we know it." Willy Staley, writing in the New York Times Magazine, said "Mosse highlights the eastern Congo's natural bounty while acknowledging both the medium's origins and, he points out, the West's tendency to see in the Congo only darkness and insanity."

Criticism 
Mosse has received criticism for his work, notably from Ireland, for presenting difficult global conflicts or deeply personal situations amidst these conflicts in an overly aestheticised way, being described as "problematic", "troubling", and discomforting.

Career 
He has worked in Iraq, Iran, Pakistan, Palestine, Haiti and the former Yugoslavia. 

Mosse made photographs of the war in the eastern Democratic Republic of Congo using colour infrared film with which he intended to create a new perspective on conflict. Kodak Aerochrome is a false-color infrared film originally intended for aerial vegetation surveys and for military reconnaissance, such as to identify camouflaged targets. It registers light that is invisible to humans, rendering the grass and trees and soldiers' uniforms in vivid hues of lavender, crimson and hot pink. He used this same film to make a documentary film entitled The Enclave, with cinematographer Trevor Tweeten and composer Ben Frost. This work was published in three publications, exhibited in solo exhibitions, and won the Deutsche Börse Photography Prize in 2014.

In 2017 his video installation Incoming, commissioned by the National Gallery of Victoria and the Barbican Art Gallery, also made with Frost and Tweeten, won the Prix Pictet. In 2020 he was awarded an Honorary Fellowship of the Royal Photographic Society.

Solo exhibitions 
2008: Airside, Jack Shainman Gallery, New York.
2012: Infra, Künstlerhaus Bethanien, Berlin.
2012: The Enclave (film), Venice Biennale. Eight-channel version of his video installation.
2014: The Enclave, The Photographers' Gallery, London.
2017: Incoming, Curve Gallery, Barbican Centre, London; Le Lieu unique, Nantes, France, 2019.

Awards 
 2006–2008: Leonore Annenberg Fellowship in the Performing and Visual Arts from the Annenberg Public Policy Center, University of Pennsylvania
 2011: Guggenheim Fellowship from the John Simon Guggenheim Memorial Foundation
 2014: Deutsche Börse Photography Prize
2017: Prix Pictet, for Heat Maps
 2020: Honorary Fellowship of the Royal Photographic Society, Bristol

Filmography
 The Enclave (2013) – a collaboration with cinematographer Trevor Tweeten and composer Ben Frost. Made using 16 mm infrared film transferred to HD video. Shown as an installation comprising multiple double-sided screens installed in a darkened chamber.
 Incoming (2017) – a collaboration with Frost and Tweeten.

Bibliography 
 Infra. New York, NY: Aperture, 2012. With an essay by Adam Hochschild.
 Hardback. .
 Collector's edition. Edition of 500 copies.
 The Enclave. New York, NY: Aperture, 2013. With an essay by Jason Stearns.
 Paperback. . Edition of 750 copies.
 Boxed set. Edition of 250 copies. Includes a vinyl record with sound and music, designed by Ben Frost; a poster featuring an image by Mosse; a transcription from the film; and a signed-and-numbered copy of the book.
A Supplement to The Enclave. Berlin: Broken Dimanche Press, 2014. . Edited by John Holten. With texts by Chrisy Lange, Patrick Mudekereza and Charles Stankievech and conversations between Richard Mosse and Trevor Tweeten and Ben Frost. Newspaper format.
Richard Mosse Catalogue. Curve Publications. London: Barbican, 2017. With an interview between Mosse and Alona Pardo, and a text by Anthony Downey.
Incoming. London: Mack, 2017. . With texts by Giorgio Agamben and Mosse.
The Castle. London: Mack, 2018. With texts in a booklet by Judith Butler, Paul K Saint Amour, Behrouz Boochani and Mosse. . Second edition, 2019.

References

External links
 
 Moss profile, carliergebauer.com

1980 births
Living people
Alumni of King's College London
Yale School of Art alumni
Irish photographers
People from County Kilkenny
Irish contemporary artists
Magnum photographers
21st-century British photographers